Nygmia semifumosa is a moth of the family Erebidae. It is endemic to Borneo. Males have a characteristically sparse and irregular scattering of black scales on the yellow forewing. Females have a similar, but even more sparse scattering, and diagnostic white patches; the hindwings are dark grey to about two thirds.

References

Lymantriinae
Moths described in 1976